The Tiffany & Co. flagship store is a ten-story retail building in Midtown Manhattan, New York City, within the luxury shopping district on Fifth Avenue between 49th and 60th Streets. The building, at 727 Fifth Avenue, has served as Tiffany & Co.'s sixth flagship store since its completion in 1940. It was designed by New York City architects Cross & Cross in a "conservative modern" style.

The building contains a facade of granite and limestone. Its five storefront displays, changed about eight times a year, have had various designers over their history. A  statue of the mythological figure Atlas is situated on the second story of the building's west facade, facing Fifth Avenue. The building's first-floor main salesroom, covering  with a ceiling , has no supporting columns in its superstructure. The upper floors were built with public and private showrooms.

Prior to the building's construction, Tiffany & Co. had its flagship at 401 Fifth Avenue, twenty blocks south. The site was leased from First National City Bank in May 1939 and the store opened on October 21, 1940; Tiffany's bought the underlying land in 1963. The building was notably featured in the 1961 film Breakfast at Tiffany's. The store, originally seven stories tall, was expanded in 1980 with a three-story rooftop addition designed by Peter Claman. Tiffany's sold the building in 1984 and reacquired it fifteen years later. The store was renovated during the early 2000s. As part of another renovation, including a replacement rooftop structure, the store temporarily closed in 2020.

Architecture

The original building is a seven-story structure designed by New York City architects Cross & Cross in a "conservative modern" style and completed in 1940. The main contractor for the work was Turner Construction. Architectural historian Paul Goldberger cites it as an important retail building in New York City, and an important example of the transition from classicism to modernism in architecture. Upon the building's completion, a critic for Architectural Forum magazine characterized it as a monumental structure with an "orthodox" exterior and a utilitarian interior. 

A three-story addition was built in 1980 to designs by Peter Claman. An ongoing renovation will replace it with a similarly-sized new structure. 

The flagship contains about 114,000 pieces of jewelry, including a $2.475 million engagement ring.

Exterior 
The original structure's facade contains a pink-granite base and limestone on its upper stories. The main entrance, on the western facade, contains a rectangular limestone frame with a wheat-leaf pattern. The vertical bays contain windows that are separated horizontally by marble spandrels between each floor. The window frames are made of stainless steel and are bounded by pieces of Alpine marble, which hold the facade's shatterproof glass windows in place. The top of the original building contains a scalloped cornice. The use of limestone in the facade was intended to evoke older store buildings, but Cross & Cross used a more modernistic Art Deco style because it "better expressed the modern age".  

The building's exterior windows include five storefront displays (two on Fifth Avenue and three on 57th Street), which are changed about eight times a year and are planned more than a year in advance. The displays have been designed by various designers over their history. Gene Moore designed the displays for nearly forty years using smaller materials to frame the more expensive jewelry. Other window dressers have included Rachel Zoe, who in 2012 designed displays depicting the "Hollywood glamour" of the mid-20th century, as well as Baz Luhrmann and Catherine Martin, who designed Great Gatsby-themed displays in 2013.

Atlas statue

A  statue of the mythological figure Atlas is situated on the second story of the building's west facade, facing Fifth Avenue. The statue, shouldering a four-foot-wide clock, was built to stand atop the entranceway to the company's third flagship store in 1853. Charles Tiffany commissioned his friend Henry Frederick Metzler, a carver of ship figureheads, to design the work. The statue has traveled as the company has relocated its flagship. The work was repaired in 1990 and 2006.

The statue stood as an icon of the brand; the fifth flagship store did not have the name "Tiffany" appear on its facades, with only the statue and clock denoting the store's presence.

The statue is of a bearded, thin man, wearing nothing except a crossed leather strap. The figure stands upright, unbent from how it appears to hold the large clock above it. His left foot is placed in front of him, partially off the statue's base. The work is a realistic impression of the human form. It was sculpted from wood of a fir tree, painted to resemble the patina of weathered bronze; the feet are made of solid lead.

Tiffany & Co. has released products based on the statue's design, and has created replicas for its stores in other locations across the country.

Interior 
It has no supporting columns in its superstructure. The ceiling is instead supported by three 100-ton trusses spanning the  width of the building, each of which consists of upper and lower girders connected by crossbeams. Upon the building's completion, the floors and pilasters were made of teakwood, while the display cases were decorated in teak, walnut, and marble. Merchandise such as jewelry was placed in wooden display cases with stainless-steel frames. These cases rested on wood, stainless steel, or granite pedestals. The display cases and spaces were illuminated using indirect lighting fixtures. The salesroom's most prominent permanent display is the Tiffany Yellow Diamond, a 128.54-carat gem.

The upper floors were built with public and private showrooms. The first four stories contained retail departments, while the upper stories contained offices, jewelers' studios, and a repair shop. The first mezzanine level contained three private showrooms, one each in the French, English, and Modern architectural styles. There were aslso five glass-enclosed buying rooms. The flagship store includes a café on its fourth floor, Blue Box Cafe, opened in 2017. The café has a breakfast, lunch, and tea menu and is decorated in Tiffany Blue, the color for which the brand is known.

The building was one of the first major retail buildings built with central air conditioning in New York City. A heating plant for the ground floor was placed in the basement, while the upper floors were heated and ventilated through the original double-story penthouse on the roof.

History

Construction 

The flagship store is the sixth for the company, which moved uptown five times since its founding in 1837. Immediately prior to the construction of the building at Fifth Avenue and 57th Street, Tiffany & Co. had its flagship at 401 Fifth Avenue, twenty blocks south. Meanwhile, in the early 20th century, the section of Fifth Avenue south of 59th Street was becoming a commercial area. By the 1920s, the intersection of Fifth Avenue and 57th Street contained commercial buildings, including the Heckscher Building and a branch of the New York Trust Company, which were interspersed with 19th-century mansions, music shops, and art dealerships. The site of the current Tiffany's flagship had been occupied by Collis P. Huntington's mansion until 1926.

In May 1939, the company leased the 57th Street site from First National City Bank, which acted as trustee for the William Waldorf Astor estate. In a multi-part transaction, National City Bank acquired the 57th Street site from the previous owner of the Huntington site, as well as Tiffany's 37th Street building. Tiffany's then hired Cross and Cross to design a new flagship at that location. That August, Cross and Cross filed plans for the 57th Street structure with the New York City Department of Buildings. Turner Construction was awarded the general construction contract and had already started demolishing the previous four-story structure on the site.

Prior to the 727 Fifth Avenue building's completion, Charles B. Driscoll wrote in April 1940: "The new Tiffany building is close enough to completion to indicate that it is to be one of the substantial ornaments to this part of town." The 727 Fifth Avenue store opened on October 21, 1940, without any fanfare; it was visited by 12,000 people in its first day of operation. It had an estimated cost of $1 million. Upon the building's completion, the Fifth Avenue Association deemed it the "best new structure erected in the Fifth Avenue section during 1940". Cross & Cross never designed another building in New York City and ultimately ceased operation in 1942.

20th century 
In 1961, the store's interior and exterior were filmed for Breakfast at Tiffany's, a culturally significant film designated by the Library of Congress. A 2017 renovation added a cafe inside the building, quoted by news sources as finally allowing for a "breakfast at Tiffany"; the menu also includes a meal with that name.

In 1963, Tiffany's bought the land under its flagship location from First National City Bank, as well as the adjacent corner property that was occupied by Bonwit Teller. The company paid $1.25 million for the store building and $2.8 million for the corner property. The sale had been necessitated because Lord Astor of Hever, the beneficiary of the Astor trust that owned the lots, had recently moved to the United Kingdom. Astor had been forced to sell the lots because British law at the time forbade its subjects to own any property outside the United Kingdom. 

By the late 1970s, the Tiffany's flagship had become overcrowded, in part because the company's overall success had resulted in increased sales. Tiffany & Co. president Walter Hoving contemplated a proposal to move a portion of the store across the intersection, but rejected the idea because transporting the merchandise every day would have caused logistical issues. In 1978, Peter Claman was hired to design a  expansion, which included constructing three stories on the roof. The expansion was completed in 1980. Tiffany's received a $5 million tax credit for completing the expansion, although the company's eligibility for the tax credit was subsequently investigated because the credit was not supposed to be given to retailers.

Developer and future U.S. president Donald Trump purchased the building's air rights for $5 million in 1979 while he was developing the neighboring Trump Tower. Trump had considered the Tiffany's flagship to be the city's best real-estate property, and he had wanted to prevent another developer from tearing down the store to build a taller building. Trump later named his daughter Tiffany Trump after the location; the air rights acquisition was reportedly one of his favorite deals.

After Avon Products acquired Tiffany's in the early 1980s, the building was sold in 1984 to a Texas investment syndicate, who paid $66.5 million and leased the space back to Tiffany's. The syndicate resold the building to Daiichi Real Estate in 1986 for $94.35 million. At the time, the property contained . Following the early 1990s recession, the property became unprofitable for Daiichi, which resold the building to Tiffany's in 1999 for $94 million.

In 1998, preservationists requested that the New York City Landmarks Preservation Commission (LPC) consider the Tiffany's flagship for city landmark status. According to preservationist John Jurayj, the LPC said it would take the designation into consideration, but it did not make any further comment on the issue. Preservationists sent another request to the LPC in 2001, requesting the Tiffany's store be considered for landmark status, but they again received no responses over the following several years.

21st century 

Starting in 2001, Yabu Pushelberg redesigned portions of the flagship store, reworking its second and fourth floors, and opening its fifth and sixth into public spaces. While the renovation was initially scheduled to be completed in 2004, it was not actually finished until late 2006.

In 2020, Tiffany began a two-year renovation of 727 Fifth Avenue, and moved its store next-door to 6 East 57th Street. The four-story temporary store is called The Tiffany Flagship Next Door. It was built for Nike's Niketown store, there from 1996 to 2017. Tiffany had also previously used the space for a holiday pop-up. The building is owned by the Trump Organization, which owns Trump Tower, occupying the rest of the western half of the city block. The renovation process will involve a redesign of the building's interior spaces, and removal of a three-story rooftop addition built in 1980, and replace it with a new similarly-sized addition designed by OMA. The renovation necessitated lifting a crane onto the building's roof, only the fourth time in the city's history that had occurred. A 105-ton crane, with assistance from another and eight trucks as counterweights, lifted a 66-ton crane onto the structure.

In popular culture

The store has been featured in multiple works of film and literature. These include Truman Capote's novella Breakfast at Tiffany's (1958) and the films Breakfast at Tiffany's (1961) and Sweet Home Alabama (2002).

See also
 15 Union Square West, the company's fourth flagship store
 Tiffany and Company Building, the company's fifth flagship

References

External links

 Store information page, Tiffany & Co. website
 Building history, Tiffany & Co. website

1940 establishments in New York City
57th Street (Manhattan)
Commercial buildings completed in 1940
Commercial buildings in Manhattan
Fifth Avenue
Midtown Manhattan
Retail buildings in New York (state)
Tiffany & Co.